White Shoes is a country album by Emmylou Harris.

White Shoes may also refer to:
White Shoes & The Couples Company, Indonesian pop band
Billy "White Shoes" Johnson, American football player

See also
The White Shoes (disambiguation)